Mike McVey is a game designer who has worked primarily on miniature wargames.

Career
Mike McVey formerly worked for Games Workshop. McVey created the high-quality metal miniatures for Chainmail (2001) for Wizards of the Coast. McVey discussed how to paint miniatures in his "Role Models" column in Dragon. McVey left Wizards of the Coast in 2002, and became one of the partners in Privateer Press.

References

External links
 Mike McVey :: Pen & Paper RPG Database archive

Games Workshop
Living people
Miniature wargames
Year of birth missing (living people)